The 1998 Norwegian Football Cup Final was the final match of the 1998 Norwegian Football Cup, the 93rd season of the Norwegian Football Cup, the premier Norwegian football cup competition organized by the Football Association of Norway (NFF). The match was played on 1 November 1998 at the Ullevaal Stadion in Oslo, and opposed two Tippeligaen sides Stabæk and Rosenborg. Stabæk defeated Rosenborg 3–1 after extra time to claim the Norwegian Cup for a first time in their history.

Match

Details

References

1998
Football Cup
Stabæk Fotball matches
Rosenborg BK matches
Sports competitions in Oslo
Norwegian Football Cup
1990s in Oslo